The 2016–17 season was FC Barcelona Femení's 16th season as FC Barcelona's official women's football section. It was the last of eleven seasons managed by Xavi Llorens and in it Barcelona notably became the first Spanish team to reach the semifinals of the UEFA Women's Champions League in its fifth appearance on a row in the competition.

Summary

Background and preseason
In 2015–16 Barcelona had ended the season with no titles for the first time since the 2009–10 season: Athletic Bilbao had won the league by a one-point margin and Atlético Madrid defeated Barcelona in the national cup's final. To strengthen the team Barcelona signed Andressa Alves from Montpellier and Line Røddik Hansen from European champion Olympique Lyonnais (though she hadn't taken part in the European campaign as she had started the 2015–16 season in Rosengård) as well as Ange N'Guessan, the team's first African player. Leila Ouahabi returned after three seasons in Valencia, and with the season started Vicky Losada also rejoined Barça following the end of the English championship. On the other hand, the Garrote sisters and Cristina Baudet were transferred to nearby Espanyol, Andrea Falcón and Esther Romero to rivals Atlético and Valencia and Andreia Norton returned to Portugal.

Season
Barcelona started the season with nine consecutive victories on a 34–1 goal-average before conceding a draw against newly promoted Betis. Next it defeated defending champion Athletic, which was already falling behind in the table. The team ended 2016 with a draw against Valencia and a 2–1 defeat against Atlético in Vicente Calderón before a crowd of 13,935, losing the lead in the table to the latter. Meanwhile, Barça had made it to the Champions League's quarterfinals after overcoming Minsk and Twente (which they had already faced in the same round in the previous season) with wide away wins. Next they faced quarterfinals-regular Rosengård.

With Atlético remaining unbeaten, a 2–0 defeat against Santa Teresa kept Barcelona away from the lead. However the team then chained an 11-wins streak and reached Atlético in the top of the table in April with 5 games remaining. In the meantime Barcelona defeated Rosengård both in Barcelona and Malmö, becoming the first Spanish team to reach the Champions League's semifinals, where they lost both games against Paris Saint-Germain, which had already ousted them in the past season's quarterfinals. Following the elimination Barcelona attained its largest win in the season, a 13–0 victory over Oiartzun, which would end relegated.

After defeating Valencia in Paterna and with long-time manager Xavi Llorens having just announced stepping down the position following the end of the season, Barcelona faced undefeated Atlético in the second-to-last game on equal points and a much larger goal average: a win would make them either mathematically or virtually champions. However the game ended in a 1–1 draw, and Barcelona was forced to depend on an Atlético blunder. Not only did Atlético defeat Real Sociedad but Barcelona lost 2–1 to Levante and thus they again ended the championship as runners-up with 75 points, their least in the 16-team Primera División by one point. On the other hand, Jennifer Hermoso was the competition's top scorer with 35 goals, the major goal-scoring record by a Barcelona player in the same period.

In the Copa de la Reina Barcelona qualified for the Final Four in the Ciudad del Fútbol after overcoming Real Sociedad in the extra time. There it first defeated Valencia in the semifinals before facing Atlético in a rematch of the previous edition's final, which Barcelona had lost 3–2. However, this time Barcelona defeated Atlético 4–1 and won its first nationwide title since the 2014–15 League.

Transfers

Squad

Results

 
Numbers in brackets in league games show the team's position in the table following the match

Pre-season

UEFA Women's Champions League

Primera División

League table

Results

Copa de la Reina

Primera División statistics

References

FC Barcelona Femení seasons
2016–17 in Spanish women's football
Barcelona Femenino